Salma Shaheen (born 16 April 1954) is a Pakistani poet, fiction writer, researcher, and the first Pashto-woman novelist, who also served as the first-woman director of Pashto Academy of University of Peshawar. She primarily wrote poems in Urdu and Pashto languages since started her literary work. Shaheen is recognized one of the prominent women writers in Khyber Pakhtunkhwa who is believed to have made a significant contribution to Pashto language, culture and to its literature.

Early life
Salma was born on 16 April 1954 in Baghdada town in Mardan, Khyber Pakhtunkhwa. She did her secondary schooling from a government school in 1971, and later attended the Women University Mardan (formerly Government College for Women, Mardan) in 2002 and completed further education, including graduation, and doctor's degree with Modern Pashto poem.

Career
Shaheen was initially involved in writings and started her career during childhood. It is believed she originally began writing when she was studying in eighth standard. Her father played a significant role in her career and encouraged her to earn moral authority for Pakhto women. As a director of Pashto Academy, she restored language regulatory institution in 2011 which was previously merged into a not-known institution called Centre for Pashto language and literature. She is also credited for bringing out 120 Pakhtunwali books on hujra, music, dance and jirga.

Literary work
As a poet, Shaheen wrote fourteen to eighteen books in Urdu and Pashto languages, and as a researcher, she wrote folk songs or a research book on folk music titled "Pashto Tapa", short stories, including "Kanri Auo Aghzi" which translates as stones and thorns. Her poetic books include "Za Hum Haghse Wara Way" and "Nawey Sahar" which was originally published in 1982. As a researcher, she has published 42 publications on various topics, including social, culture, tradition and language barriers. Her poetry is focused on Pashto culture, literature, and traditions. She is credited for writing two novels titled "Ka Rana Shawa" and "Kani Au Azghi". She also wrote poems which are recognized one of prominent books which includes "Abasin Da Tarikh", "Muasharati Au Saqafati Asar" and "Awami Sandare". As a writer, she represented Pakistan in numerous countries at literary events such as seminars and conferences and was nominated member of a cultural delegation to China. During her visit to China, she wrote a book titled "Dil Aur Ankhein Cheen Main". 

Publication

Research Paper written by Dr Salma Shaheen are following:  

Research Papers

Awards
Shaheen is the receipt of numerous awards for her contribution to Pashto literature, social, culture and tradition. Her awards include Abasin Art Council Award, Pakistan Culture Association Award, Pakistan Academy of Letters Hijra and Tamgha-e-Imtiaz which was conferred by the government of Pakistan in 2009.

References

Living people
1954 births
People from Mardan District
Women University Mardan alumni
Pashto-language poets
Urdu-language poets from Pakistan
20th-century Pakistani poets
20th-century Pakistani women writers
Pakistani women short story writers
Pakistani short story writers
Pakistani women novelists
Pakistani novelists
Recipients of Tamgha-e-Imtiaz